Thomas O'Driscoll Hunter (December 19, 1932 – December 27, 2017) was an American actor known for work in Spaghetti Westerns and as a Hollywood screenwriter.  He was also the founder of the New England Repertory Company.

Biography
Born in Savannah, Georgia, Hunter served in the United States Marine Corps and graduated from the University of Virginia.  He studied acting with Sanford Meisner and Uta Hagen.

He entered film in a small role in Blake Edwards' What Did You Do in the War, Daddy? (1966). After completing the film, a chance meeting with Dino De Laurentiis led him to be invited to star as the lead in The Hills Run Red leading him to a career in European cinema with guest appearances in American television series. His dissatisfaction with European cinema led him to found the New England Repertory Company.

Hunter published two books. The novel Softly Walks the Beast is an end-of-the-world story that takes place in the not-too-distant future and centers on a dwindling community of smart and resourceful people on a college campus, struggling against the horrible and seemingly unstoppable after-effects of a nuclear war. "Softly Walks the Beast" was first published in 1982 and a second edition was published in 2014.

In 2015, Hunter published Memoirs of a Spaghetti Cowboy: Tales of Oddball Luck and Derring-Do, which chronicles his adventures starring in numerous Spaghetti Westerns and other foreign productions while living in Rome.

Filmography

Screenwriter
 The 'Human' Factor (1975)
 The Final Countdown (1980)

Actor

Notes

External links
 

1932 births
2017 deaths
American male film actors
American male television actors
United States Marines
Male Spaghetti Western actors
Actors from Savannah, Georgia
Writers from Savannah, Georgia
Military personnel from Georgia (U.S. state)